Galaxy Press is a trade name set up to publish and promote the fiction works
of L. Ron Hubbard, and the anthologies of the L. Ron Hubbard Writers of the Future contest.

The company was separated from Bridge Publications in the early 2000s, and is a business name of Author Services Inc. which is, in turn, completely owned by the Church of Spiritual Technology. Bridge now focuses solely on Hubbard's Scientology and nonfiction works.

They published The Kingslayer as an audio-book in 2003 as well as L. Ron Hubbard Master Story-Teller, a coffee-table book  by William J. Widder.

In 2004 they published a new edition of To the Stars as well as in audio-book form.

In 2008, they announced they would be releasing eighty volumes containing the works Hubbard wrote for pulp magazines, at the rate of four titles every four or five months. The release is scheduled to be accompanied by a $1.9 million marketing campaign, including commercials on such programs popular with middle school children as Transformers and SpongeBob SquarePants. John Goodwin, the president of Galaxy Press, stated that the sale and marketing of the books is not intended to recruit people into the Church of Scientology. The profits from the books will go toward marketing future fiction books and to Applied Scholastics, a nonprofit organization that promotes Hubbard's ideas regarding education.

References

External links
Official website

Book publishing companies based in California
L. Ron Hubbard
Scientology organizations
Publishing companies established in 2002